Semuel Pizzignacco (born 1 September 2001) is an Italian football player who plays for  club Feralpisalò.

Club career
He was used as a back-up goalkeeper in some 2017–18 Serie A games by Udinese, at the age of 16, but did not appear on the field.

Before the 2018–19 season, he moved to Vicenza. He signed his first professional contract with the club on 29 June 2020, for a term of three years. On 1 October 2020, he was loaned to Serie C club Legnago. He made his professional debut for Legnago on 4 October 2020 against Ravenna. He became the first-choice goalkeeper there, playing 37 games in the season.

Upon his return from loan, he made his Serie B debut for Vicenza on 21 August 2021 against Cittadella. He soon moved back to the bench in favour of Matteo Grandi.

On 31 January 2022, Pizzignacco was loaned to Serie C club Renate, where he completed the 2021-22 season.

On 14 July 2022, following Vicenza's relegation to Serie C, the keeper officially joined fellow third-tier side Feralpisalò on a permanent deal, signing a three-year deal.

International career
On 6 September 2021, he made his debut for his country on junior level, in an Under-20 team friendly against Serbia.

On 1 October 2021, he received his first call-up to the Under-21 squad.

References

External links
 

2001 births
People from Monfalcone
Footballers from Friuli Venezia Giulia
Living people
Italian footballers
Italy youth international footballers
Association football goalkeepers
Udinese Calcio players
L.R. Vicenza players
F.C. Legnago Salus players
A.C. Renate players
FeralpiSalò players
Serie C players
Serie B players